Trouble Busters is a 1933 American pre-Code Western film directed by Lewis D. Collins and starring Jack Hoxie, Lane Chandler and Kaye Edwards.

Cast 
Jack Hoxie as Tex Blaine 
Lane Chandler as Jim Perkins 
Kaye Edwards as Mary Ann Perkins 
Harry Todd as Skinny Cassidy 
Ben Corbett as Windy Wallace 
Slim Whitaker as Big Bill Jarvis 
William P. Burt as Dan Allen 
Roger Williams as Placerville Sheriff

References

External links

1933 Western (genre) films
American Western (genre) films
Films directed by Lewis D. Collins
Majestic Pictures films
1930s American films
1930s English-language films